Zonosaurus boettgeri, Boettger's girdled lizard, is a species of lizard in the family Gerrhosauridae. The species is endemic Madagascar.

Geographic range
Z. boettgeri is found in the northern Madagascar mainland, and on the island Nosy Be, where it is found in Lokobe Reserve.

Habitat

Description

Behavior
Z. boettgeri is arboreal.

Reproduction
Z. boettgeri is oviparous.

Etymology
The specific name, boettgeri, is in honor of German herpetologist Oskar Boettger.

References

Further reading
Glaw F, Vences M (2006). A Field Guide to the Amphibians and Reptiles of Madagascar, Third Edition. Cologne, Germany: Vences & Glaw Verlag. 496 pp. .
Raselimanana AP, Nussbaum RA, Raxworthy CJ (2006). "Observations and re-description of Zonosaurus boettgeri Steindachner 1891 and description of a second new species of long-tailed Zonosaurus from western Madagascar". Occasional Papers of the Museum of Zoology, University of Michigan (739): 1–16.
Steindachner F (1891). "Über einige neue und seltene Reptilien- und Amphibien-Arten ". Sitzungberichte der Kaiserlichen Akademie der Wissenschaften. Mathematisch-Naturwissenschaftliche Classe 100 (6): 291-316 + 2 plates. (Zonosaurus boettgeri, new species, pp. 299–301). (in German).

Zonosaurus
Reptiles of Madagascar
Endemic fauna of Madagascar
Reptiles described in 1891
Taxa named by Franz Steindachner